Florin Claudiu Ioniță (born 5 April 1990) is a Romanian rugby union player. He plays in the wing and occasionally centre position for professional SuperLiga club Steaua and București based European Challenge Cup side the Wolves. Ioniță also plays for Romania's national team the Oaks.

References

External links

1998 births
Living people
Romanian rugby union players
Romania international rugby union players
Rugby union wings